Thep Kasattri or Thep Kasat Chao, Siamese princess, was the fifth child and third daughter of King Maha Chakkraphat and Queen Suriyothai. She married the King of Lan Xang, Setthathirath.

References 

Thai princesses
Royalty of Ayutthaya
16th-century Thai women
Year of birth missing
Year of death missing